Pseudomonas vanderleydeniana is a bacterium from the genus of Pseudomonas.

References

Pseudomonadales
Bacteria described in 2022